Kinderhook is an unincorporated community in Pickaway County, in the U.S. state of Ohio.

History
A post office called Kinderhook was established in 1859, and remained in operation until 1918. Besides the post office, Kinderhook had a railroad station, grain elevator, and two country stores.

References

Unincorporated communities in Pickaway County, Ohio
Unincorporated communities in Ohio